Penponds Viaduct is a railway viaduct which carries the Cornish Main Line west of Camborne in Cornwall, England. It crosses over a small valley containing the southern arm of the Red River, and a minor road known as Viaduct Lane.

The Hayle Railway opened the railway through this site in 1837 to link Hayle and Redruth. To overcome a significant change in elevation an inclined plane was built to the east of the present viaduct. When the West Cornwall Railway took over the route, it built a timber trestle viaduct as part of a more gently-graded route which by-passed the inclined plane.

The present-day viaduct was built by the Great Western Railway in 1888 as part of a programme to replace the timber viaducts on the line and prepare the single-track route for double track. It is built of brick arches on stone piers.

References

External links

 Aerial view
 Photos: 1902

Railway viaducts in Cornwall
Industrial archaeological sites in Cornwall